Power and Water Corporation, trading as PowerWater, is a Government of the Northern Territory owned corporation in the Northern Territory of Australia. PowerWater is the Northern Territory's premier provider of electricity, water and sewerage services. The Power and Water Corporation was formed on 1 July 2002, taking over from the former government utility Power and Water Authority. Power and Water became the first government-owned corporation in the Northern Territory. PowerWater has more than 142,120 customers.

Electricity
PowerWater owns eight minor power stations. These include the Channel Island Power Station, on Darwin Harbour’s Middle Arm which is the largest power station in the Northern Territory and the Ron Goodin Power Station at Alice Springs, the 2nd largest power station. The Katherine Power Station and the Berrimah Power Station are linked to the Channel Island Power Station. The Darwin–Katherine system links from the Channel Island Power Station to Berrimah and Katherine power stations. Other power stations in the territory include the McArthur River Power Station, the Tennant Creek Power Station, the Brewer Estate Power Station and the Yulara Power Station.

A new power plant, the Weddell Power Station, was constructed in 2008–2014. The first two generators came on line in 2008–2009. The third generator was due to be completed in 2011–2012 but did not get commissioned until 2014. The power station added 30% capacity to Darwin's power supply.

Water

PowerWater is also responsible for management of sewerage and the major water catchments in the region. Water is mainly stored in the largest dam, The Darwin River Dam which holds up to 90% of Darwin's water supply. For many years, Darwin's principal water supply came from Manton Dam.

References

External links
PowerWater
PowerWater History
Darwin River Dam
About

Government-owned companies of the Northern Territory
Electric power companies of Australia
Water companies of Australia
Government agencies of the Northern Territory
2002 establishments in Australia
Energy in the Northern Territory